FC Lviv was a Ukrainian football club from the city of Lviv. It was initially founded in 1992.

History
The idea about a new city's club was initiated by a Ukrainian coach Mykhailo Vilkhovyi. The club was established in 1992 as an amateur team that won the Lviv Oblast Cup and the oblast second tier competitions.

In 1993 the club entered the Ukrainian Transitional League and in two seasons progressed two tiers reaching the Ukrainian First League where it stayed until 2001. It was one of three teams that were admitted to the 1993–94 Ukrainian Transitional League and did not play in the previous 1992–93 Ukrainian Football Amateur League.

In 2001 the club was dissolved and merged with FC Karpaty Lviv as its second team.

This club held a record for being the only team from outside the Ukrainian Premier League that has progressed twice to the quarterfinals of the Ukrainian Cup competition.

League and Cup history
{|class="wikitable"
|- style="background:#efefef;"
! Season
! Div.
! Pos.
! Pl.
! W
! D
! L
! GS
! GA
! P
!Domestic Cup
!colspan=2|Europe
!Notes
|-
|align=center|1993–94
|align=center|4th
|align=center|4
|align=center|34
|align=center|20
|align=center|8
|align=center|6
|align=center|57
|align=center|33
|align=center|48
|align=center|1/16 finals
|align=center|
|align=center|
|  style="text-align:center; background:green;"|Promoted
|-
|align=center|1994–95
|align=center|3rd
|  style="text-align:center; background:silver;"|2
|align=center|42
|align=center|30
|align=center|3
|align=center|9
|align=center|73
|align=center|39
|align=center|93
|align=center|1/64 finals
|align=center|
|align=center|
|  style="text-align:center; background:green;"|Promoted
|-
|align=center|1995–96
|align=center|2nd
|align=center|11
|align=center|42
|align=center|18
|align=center|8
|align=center|16
|align=center|55
|align=center|42
|align=center|62
|align=center|1/32 finals
|align=center|
|align=center|
|align=center|
|-
|align=center|1996–97
|align=center|2nd
|align=center|8
|align=center|46
|align=center|20
|align=center|9
|align=center|17
|align=center|56
|align=center|43
|align=center|22
|align=center|1/16 finals
|align=center|
|align=center|
|align=center|
|-
|align=center|1997–98
|align=center|2nd
|align=center|15
|align=center|42
|align=center|16
|align=center|6
|align=center|20
|align=center|65
|align=center|54
|align=center|54
|align=center|1/32 finals
|align=center|
|align=center|
|align=center|
|-
|align=center|1998–99
|align=center|2nd
|align=center|7
|align=center|38
|align=center|15
|align=center|12
|align=center|11
|align=center|58
|align=center|43
|align=center|57
|align=center|1/16 finals
|align=center|
|align=center|
|align=center|
|-
|align=center|1999–00
|align=center|2nd
|align=center|7
|align=center|34
|align=center|13
|align=center|12
|align=center|9
|align=center|34
|align=center|31
|align=center|51
|align=center|1/4 finals
|align=center|
|align=center|
|align=center|
|-
|align=center|2000–01
|align=center|2nd
|align=center|5
|align=center|34
|align=center|17
|align=center|7
|align=center|10
|align=center|40
|align=center|31
|align=center|58
|align=center|1/4 finals
|align=center|
|align=center|
|align=center|
|-
|align=center|Since 2001
| style="text-align:center;" colspan="13"| refer to FC Karpaty-2 Lviv
|}

Coaches
 1993–1994 Mykhailo Vilkhovyi
 1994–1998 Stepan Yurchyshyn
 1999–2001 Volodymyr Zhuravchak

References

External links
 Zaremba, R. We are preparing to the 20th Anniversary (Готуємось до 20-ти річчя !!!). FC Lviv. 14 February 2012

 
Football clubs in Lviv
Defunct football clubs in Ukraine
Association football clubs established in 1992
Association football clubs disestablished in 2001
1992 establishments in Ukraine
2001 disestablishments in Ukraine